Leptobalanus is a genus of flowering plants belonging to the family Chrysobalanaceae.

Its native range is Mexico to Southern Tropical America and Trinidad.

Species:

Leptobalanus albiflorus 
Leptobalanus apetalus 
Leptobalanus bullatus 
Leptobalanus calvescens 
Leptobalanus cardiophyllus 
Leptobalanus cuatrecasasii 
Leptobalanus cuspidatus 
Leptobalanus diegogomezii 
Leptobalanus emarginatus 
Leptobalanus foveolatus 
Leptobalanus fuchsii 
Leptobalanus gardneri 
Leptobalanus granvillei 
Leptobalanus humilis 
Leptobalanus jefensis 
Leptobalanus joseramosii 
Leptobalanus latus 
Leptobalanus longistylus 
Leptobalanus maguirei 
Leptobalanus mexicanus 
Leptobalanus morii 
Leptobalanus octandrus 
Leptobalanus parvifolius 
Leptobalanus persaudii 
Leptobalanus sclerophyllus 
Leptobalanus sparsipilis 
Leptobalanus sprucei 
Leptobalanus stevensii 
Leptobalanus turbinatus 
Leptobalanus undulatus 
Leptobalanus wurdackii

References

Chrysobalanaceae
Chrysobalanaceae genera